Frankie Sheahan (born August 27, 1976) is a retired professional Irish rugby union player. During his career, Sheahan played for Munster from 1996 until 2009 and for Ireland from 2000 until 2007. Sheahan played his whole career as a hooker.

He finished with Munster in 2009 after playing 163 over 14 years. He played his last game for Munster on 15 May 2009 in 36-10 Celtic League win over the Ospreys at Thomond Park where the team also received the trophy as 2008–09 Celtic League winners.

Sheahan agreed to join French Top 14 club Brive for the 2009–10 season, he was offered the choice of a two-year deal or a one-year contract with the option of a second season and has chosen the latter. "I spent the weekend there taking in the Brive-Montauban match, there’s a load of ambition," Sheahan said. On May 15 he picked up an injury during the Celtic League win over the Ospreys and aggravated a chest problem. He had been struggling with the injury for the past four months and on 21 July 2009, he announced his immediate retirement from the game after undergoing a scan.

References

External links
Munster profile
Scrum.com profile
https://www.irishtimes.com/sport/sheahan-gets-two-year-ban-1.365893

1976 births
Irish rugby union players
Living people
Canadian rugby union players
Canadian people of Irish descent
Sportspeople from Ontario
Ireland international rugby union players
Munster Rugby players
Cork Constitution players
University College Cork RFC players
People educated at Presentation Brothers College, Cork
Rugby union hookers
Ireland Wolfhounds international rugby union players
Rugby union players from County Cork